The decade of the 1080s in art involved some significant events.

Events
 c. 1080–1100: The Master of Daphni makes the mosaic of Christ Pantocrator in the central dome of the katholikon at Daphni Monastery in Greece
 1081: Komnenian dynasty begins the Comnenian Age of Byzantine art

Paintings

 1080: Unknown Indian painter – Completion of the Wisdom

Births
 1085: Zhang Zeduan – Chinese painter during the transitional period from the Northern Song to the Southern Song Dynasty (died 1145)
 1082: Emperor Huizong of Song – Chinese emperor of the Song Dynasty who was also a skilled poet, painter, calligrapher, and musician (died 1135)

Deaths

References

Art
Years of the 11th century in art